Alvin Mansfield Owsley (June 11, 1888 – April 3, 1967) was an American diplomat who served as the National Commander of the American Legion from 1922 to 1923, and later served as United States minister to Romania, the Irish Free State, and Denmark.

Early life and education 
Owsley was born and raised in Denton, Texas, son of Alvin Clark and Sallie (Blount) Owsley. He remained in Texas with his family while working for his elementary and secondary education, and also while attending a term at North Texas State College in 1904. Later that year, he joined the Virginia Military Institute, where he developed into captain of Company A, and in 1909 graduated in the upper tier of his class. He completed his law degree at the University of Texas in 1912. He married Lucy Ball of Muncie, Indiana, in May 1925. They had three children. He began work in 1912 with his father's legal firm, but then served in the Texas Legislature in 1913–1914. In 1915, he became the county and district attorney in Denton County, a title he held until 1917.

World War I 
Owsley traded his political and legal responsibilities to serve in World War I with the 36th Infantry Division. He was involved in many important World War I campaigns and offensives through 1918, especially the Meuse-Argonne Offensive. He was honourably discharged as a lieutenant colonel in 1919. His discharge was accompanied by several military decorations as well, including the French Legion of Honour and the Order of Polonia Restituta.

The American Legion 
Owsley was present in 1919 at the formative caucus meeting of the American Legion in Paris, and was later elected National Commander in 1921, spending his year long term in support of veterans' issues, such as prosecution of war profiteers. Using official records from Washington, Owsley found that over one hundred thousand war veterans were not receiving adequate financial support. During his 1922–1923 tenure as leader of the American Legion, Owsley made numerous speeches in which he openly endorsed and supported both Benito Mussolini and Fascism, as well as drew analogies between the fascist movement and the American Legion. His priorities were on display at a San Francisco assembly just before retiring from his head position, where he stated that better hospitalization, rehabilitation, adjusted compensation, and Americanization were necessary for veterans.

Career 
From 1923 to 1933 the legal partnership of Burgess, Owsley, Story, and Stewart was the focus of Owsley's career. With gained stability at home in Texas, in May 1925 Alvin married Lucy Ball, daughter of Frank Ball of the Ball Brothers. He attempted an unsuccessful campaign for the Democratic nomination to the United States Senate in 1928. In 1933, Owsley was rewarded for his efforts as a campaign speaker for Franklin D. Roosevelt with an appointment as the US Minister to Romania (1933–1935). He also served as minister to the Irish Free State (1935–1937) and completed his diplomatic work as minister to Denmark (1937–1939). He resigned in 1939, with increased international tensions and Roosevelt's announcement for a third term as President.

Later life 
Though a Democrat, Owsley rejected Roosevelt's bid to run for a third term and campaigned for Wendell Willkie in 1940. Owsley remained in politics, but helping the Texas campaigns of Republicans Thomas Dewey and Dwight D. Eisenhower. In 1941, he started work for his father-in-law, Frank Ball, at the Ball Brothers' Glass Manufacturing Company, first in Muncie, Indiana, and in 1944 moving to Dallas, where he retired as vice president. He represented the American Legion in support of American soldier William S. Girard in his 1957–1958 manslaughter trial in Tokyo. Owsley died in Dallas in 1967.

Legacy 
At the University of Texas, the Alvin Owsley Endowed Presidential Scholarship in Law was established in 1991 for his son Alvin M Owsley Jr.

References

Further reading 
"1940," Time magazine. Vol. 34 no. 6. August 7, 1939.
Adams, Marion S. Alvin M. Owsley of Texas: Apostle of Americanism. Waco:  Texian Press, 1971.
National Cyclopaedia of American Biography. Vol. 54. Dallas Times Herald, April 4, 1967.

External links

 Alvin M. Owsley at the United States Department of State
 Alvin M. Owsley at The Political Graveyard

1888 births
1967 deaths
20th-century American diplomats
Ambassadors of the United States to Denmark
Ambassadors of the United States to Ireland
Ambassadors of the United States to Romania
United States Army personnel of World War I
County district attorneys in Texas
Recipients of the Legion of Honour
Democratic Party members of the Texas House of Representatives
National Commanders of the American Legion
National Guard (United States) officers
People from Denton, Texas
Recipients of the Order of Polonia Restituta
Burials at Sparkman-Hillcrest Memorial Park Cemetery
Texas lawyers
Virginia Military Institute alumni
20th-century American politicians
20th-century American lawyers
Military personnel from Texas